Profile is the tenth novel by Chris Westwood, a British author of children's and young adult fiction. It was first published in 2009, in a self-published edition. It is a dark psychological thriller about a stalker.

References

2009 British novels
Novels by Chris Westwood
British horror novels
British thriller novels
Self-published books